Mühle-Glashütte GmbH nautische Instrumente und Feinmechanik (nautical instruments and precision engineering) is a German maker of nautical instruments, ship's timepieces and wristwatches, based in Glashütte, Saxony, founded in 1994, and refounded in 2007 following bankruptcy.

Family and business history 
Mühle-Glashütte S.A. was founded in 1994 by Hans-Jürgen Mühle, father of the current CEO Thilo Mühle. The Mühle family has more than 140-year history of instrument-making craft in and around the area of Glashütte. The roots of the family business date back five generations - from the year 1869, when Robert Mühle founded his own company in Glashütte, manufacturing precision measuring instruments for the local watch industry and watchmaker school.

1869-1921: Robert Mühle 

Robert Mühle was born in 1841 in Lauenstein and completed a training as toolmaker at the watch manufacturer Moritz Grossmann. In 1869 he founded his own company in Glashütte. He manufactured precision measuring instruments for the Glashütte watch company and the watchmaking school.

The measuring instruments produced by Robert Mühle were of great importance for the Glashütte area watchmaking industry, which needed precise measuring instruments for the production of their clockworks. Besides this, they developed leading-edge technology, because the Glashütte factories used the new metric system of measurement, not the standard for the Swiss watchmaking typical Paris line used. With its precise measuring instruments in the tradition of Robert Mühle, the Mühle, the family feels obligated to the present: the precise measurement.

1921-1945: Rob. Mühle & Son 

Under the leadership of Paul, Max and Alfred Mühle, the sons of Robert Mühle, the company could expand its product range. And so from about 1925 onward, speedometers, rev counters and car clocks were made. These not only are used in cars of the brands Maybach and DKW, also BMW motorcycles were equipped with Mühle-tachometers.

The WWII caused a deep cuts in the corporate's manufacturing industry. Shortly before the end of war the Soviet Air Force bombed and destroyed large parts of Glashütte and the Mühle company.

1945-1970: Hans Mühle 

While the names of most Glashütte area watch factories have disappeared, the name "Mühle" still was connected to the center of the German precision watchmaking and a precise measurement industry. Hans Mühle founded a new company in December 1945 which manufactured dial trains for pressure and temperature measuring instruments.

1970-2007: Hans-Jürgen Mühle 

After the death of his father, Hans-Jürgen Mühle (b. 1941), took over his father's business. In 1972 the Mühle family suffered dispossession for a second time. The company was initially transformed in a national enterprise and in 1980 converted into the Glashütte Watchmaking Plants (VEB Glashütter Uhrenbetriebe).

Hans-Jürgen Mühle was still in active operation, and later became sales manager of the Glashütte Watchmaking Plants. The German unification enabled him to revive the company of his ancestors, so in 1994, he founded  "Mühle-Glashütte GmbH nautische Instrumente und Feinmechanik" (nautical instruments and precision engineering).

At the beginning Mühle produced professional marine chronometers, ship's timepieces and other nautical instruments such as Barometer or hygrometer. Two years later the production was extended to mechanical wristwatches, which quickly became the main business of the company. Mühle used in house refined Swiss movements for production of its watches. In 2005 it came into a legal dispute with a different manufacturer (Nomos Glashütte) about whether the movements go along with the so-called "Glashütte rule" (i.e., 50% of the adding value of the movement has to be realized in Glashütte). The dispute escalated and Mühle had to file for insolvency in October 2007.

2007-2011: Thilo Mühle 

Thilo Mühle (b. 1968) joined the family business in 2000. In October 2007, he took over the management of the company to pull it back from bankruptcy.

Under the leadership of Thilo Mühle the watchmaker has steadily expanded its vertical integration. In addition to the already developed in 2003 and patented a woodpecker regulation, the newly developed Glashütte three-quarter plate and the Mühle rotor, the company now has two movements with their own caliber name: the chronograph movement MU 9408 and the in March 2011 introduced manual winding movement MU 9411.

Watch models 

Mühle-Glashütte, in contrast to vendors such as Glashütte Original or A. Lange & Söhne, doesn't produce luxury watches, but focus on the medium-priced market segment with high-quality steel watches by mostly sober and restrained design. Most models are available with stainless steel bracelets or leather bands, for divers watches rubber bands are available.

The timepieces of Mühle-Glashütte are divided into four product lines. Currently (as of 06/2013) models are available in the following lines:

 Nautical Wristwatches: Marinus, Marinus GMT, Rasmus 2000, Seebataillon GMT, S.A.R. Flieger-Chronograph (Pilot's Chronograph), S.A.R. Rescue-Timer - the watch of the captains of the rescue cruiser of the German Maritime Search and Rescue Service.
 Classic Timepiece: Teutonia III Handaufzug (with the new movement MU 9411), Teutonia II Chronograph, Teutonia II Kleine Sekunde, Teutonia II Chronometer, Teutonia II Quadrant Chronograph, Teutonia II Quadrant Medium, Teutonia II Medium, Antaria Chronograph, Antaria Kleine Sekunde, Antaria Datum, Antaria Medium
 Sporty Instrument Watches: Terranaut Trail I to III, Terrasport I to III, 29er Chronograph, Big 29er, 29er, City 99, Lady 99, M 29 Classic
 Limited Special Editions: S.A.R. Anniversary-Timer, Marinus Chronograph

See also 

 List of German watch manufacturers

Literature 

 Hans Heinrich Schmid: Encyclopedia of German watchmaking industry 1850-1980. Sponsors Clock Industry Museum Association, Villingen-Schwenningen, 2005, . S. 491st

References 

 Mühle - Glashütte GmbH nautische Instrumente und Feinmechanik Gemeinsames Registerportal der Länder
 Impressum von Mühle-Glashütte: http://www.muehle-glashuette.de/impressum.html

External links 

 

Watch manufacturing companies of Germany
Watch brands
Companies based in Saxony
Glashütte
Volkseigene Betriebe